Sultan Waleed Jamaan (born 14 May 1962) is a Qatari footballer. He competed in the men's tournament at the 1984 Summer Olympics.

References

External links
 

1962 births
Living people
Qatari footballers
Al-Khor SC players
Qatar Stars League players
Qatar international footballers
Olympic footballers of Qatar
Footballers at the 1984 Summer Olympics
Place of birth missing (living people)
Association football defenders